Agaricus macrosporus is a rare, edible mushroom found from June at wood fringes and in meadows.

Description

The white cap is hemispherical and white when young, but later flattens out up to 25 cm in diameter and becomes yellowish or tan. Its flesh is very thick. The gills are pinkish grey when young, and become brown with age. The spores measure 12 by 6 μm and are purplish-brown and almond-shaped. The stem is strong and thick, with a broad ring. It may measure 8 to 12 cm in height and up to 3 cm in diameter.

The flesh is white with a mild taste and a smell of aniseed, turning slowly orange when cut.

Similar species

There is a danger of confusing this mushroom with dangerous amanitas such as Amanita phalloides and Amanita pantherina. Agaricus excellens is different by its taller and slimmer stipe which is striped lengthwise. Agaricus augustus does not have the pure white cap in young specimens.

See also

 List of Agaricus species

References

E. Garnweidner. Mushrooms and Toadstools of Britain and Europe. Collins. 1994.

macrosporus
Edible fungi
Fungi of Europe